is a passenger railway station in located in the city of Suzuka,  Mie Prefecture, Japan, operated by the private railway operator Kintetsu Railway.

Lines
Isoyama Station is served by the Nagoya Line, and is located 56.0 rail kilometers from the starting point of the line at Kintetsu Nagoya Station.

Station layout
The station was consists of two opposed side platforms, connected by a level crossing. The station is unattended.

Platforms

Adjacent stations

History
Isoyama Station opened on September 10, 1915 as a station on the Ise Railway. The Ise Railway became the Sangu Express Electric Railway’s Ise Line on September 15, 1936, and was renamed the Nagoya Line on December 7, 1938. After merging with Osaka Electric Kido on March 15, 1941, the line became the Kansai Express Railway's Nagoya Line. This line was merged with the Nankai Electric Railway on June 1, 1944 to form Kintetsu.

Passenger statistics
In fiscal 2019, the station was used by an average of 774 passengers daily (boarding passengers only).

Surrounding area
Japan National Route 23
Shin Tsuzumigaura housing complex
Suzuka Isoyama Post Office

See also
List of railway stations in Japan

References

External links

 Kintetsu: Isoyama Station

Railway stations in Japan opened in 1915
Railway stations in Mie Prefecture
Stations of Kintetsu Railway
Suzuka, Mie